WGMO (95.3 FM; "95 GMO") is a radio station  broadcasting a classic rock format. Licensed to Spooner, Wisconsin, United States, the station serves the Rice Lake area.  The station is owned by Zoe Communications, Inc. As of January, 23, 2023 WGMO’s and WGMO-HD2’s web stream no longer work due to the removal of the http:// connection it relied on. As of March, 2 2023 WGMO now streams at a separate url.

HD Radio
WGMO broadcasts in HD Radio (digital). Its HD2 subchannel carries a classic hits format known as "94.7 The River". WGMO-HD3 formerly broadcast an oldies format, but sometime in 2017, WGMO-HD3 and translator station W228BQ 93.5 FM began simulcasting WXCX in Siren.

References

External links

GMO
Classic rock radio stations in the United States
Radio stations established in 1974
1974 establishments in Wisconsin